There are three major mountain ranges in New York: the Adirondack Mountains, the Catskill Mountains, and part of the Appalachian Mountains.

Adirondack Mountains

The Adirondack Mountains are sometimes considered part of the Appalachians but, geologically speaking, are a southern extension of the Laurentian Mountains of Canada.

The highest of the Adirondack mountains are listed in the Adirondack High Peaks. Other mountains in the Adirondacks include:

Ampersand Mountain
Avalanche Mountain
Averill Peak
Baker Mountain
Bald Mountain
Baxter Mountain
Bitch Mountain
Black Mountain
Blue Mountain
Blue Ridge Mountain
Boreas Mountain
Brown Pond Mountain
Buell Mountain
Bullhead Mountain
Calamity Mountain
Cathead Mountain
Cellar Mountain
Cheney Cobble
Crane Mountain
Dun Brook Mountain
Fishing Brook Mountain
Fishing Brook Range
Floodwood Mountain
Gore Mountain
Green Mountain
Hackensack Mountain
Henderson Mountain
Hoffman Mountain
Hurricane Mountain
Jay Mountain
Jenkins Mountain
Keil Mountain
Kilburn Mountain
Lewey Mountain
Little Moose Mountain
Little Santanoni Mountain
Long Pond Mountain
Lost Pond Peak
Lyon Mountain
MacNaughton Mountain
McKenzie Mountain
Moose Mountain
Morgan Mountain
Mount Adams
Mount Arab
Mount Jo
Moon Mountain
Noonmark Mountain
Oven Mountain
Owls Head Mountain
North River Mountain
Pillsbury Mountain
Pitchoff Mountain
Poke-O-Moonshine Mountain
Puffer Mountain
bjas Mountain
Round Mountain
Saint Regis Mountain
Scarface Mountain
Sentinel Mountain
Silver Lake Mountain
Snowy Mountain
Stewart Mountain
Sunrise Mountain
Titus Mountain
Tongue Mountain Range
TR Mountain
Wakely Mountain
Wallface Mountain
Whiteface Mountain
Wilmington Peak
Wolf Pond Mountain

Catskills

The Catskills, which lie northwest of New York City and southwest of Albany are a mature dissected plateau, an uplift region that was subsequently eroded into sharp relief. They are an eastward continuation of the Allegheny Plateau. They are sometimes considered an extension of the Appalachian Mountains, but are not geologically related.

The highest of the Catskills are listed in the Catskill High Peaks.  Other high peaks in the Catskills include:

Acra Point
Ashokan High Point
Barkaboom Mountain
Baxter Mountain
Bearpen Mountain
Bear Spring Mountain
Beaver Kill Range
Beech Hill
Belle Ayr Mountain
Big Fork Mountain
Blackhead Range
Blenheim Mountain
Boomhower Hill
Bouchoux Hill
Bovina Mountain
Bramley Mountain
Bullock Hill
Burnside Hill
Burnt Knob
Cave Mountain
Chamberlain Hill
Cherry Ridge
Churchill Mountain
Clabber Peak
Clay Hill
Coe Hill
Coon Hill
Couse Hill
Cowan Mountain
Cradle Rock Ridge
Crane Hill (Sidney, Delaware County, New York)
Crane Hill (Walton, Delaware County, New York)
Denman Mountain
Devil's Path
Dingle Hill
Dry Brook Ridge
Dunk Hill
East Gray Hill
East Wildcat
East Jewett Range
Elm Tree Ridge
Farmers Hill
Federal Hill
Ferris Hill
Fleischmann Mountain
Franklin Mountain
Fuller Hill
Fords Hill
Gallop Hill
Giant Ledge
Ginseng Mountain
Grays Mountain
Hack Flats
Halcott Mountain
Haynes Mountain
Hawk Mountain
Heathen Hill
High Falls Ridge
Hodge Pond
Hodges Hill
Hog Mountain
Houck Mountain
Hubbell Hill
Hunt Hill
Huntersfield Mountain
Ice Cave Mountain
Irish Mountain
Jackass Hill
Jackson Hill
Jehu Mountain
Jensen Hill
Johnson Hill
Jump Hill
Lawton Hill
Little Pisgah
Little Rocky
Loomis Mountain
Lumbert Hill
Maben Hill
Mary Smith Hill
McCoys Knob
McGregor Mountain
Meeker Hollow
Michigan Hill
Middle Mountain
Millbrook Mountain
Mill Brook Ridge
Mohegan Hill
Mongaup Mountain
Monka Hill
Montgomery Hollow
Moresville Range
Morris Hill
Morton Hill
Mount Jefferson
Mount Pisgah
Mount Tremper
Mount Warren
North Plattekill
Narrow Notch
Negro Hill
North Mountain
Northwest Moresville Range
Old Clump Mountain
Olderbark Mountain
Onteora Mountain
Overlook Mountain
Packsaddle / Lexington Mountain
Panther Mountain
Perch Lake Mountain
Pine Island Mountain
Pines Brook Ridge
Plattekill Mountain
Point Mountain
Rattlesnake Hill
Red Hill (Delaware County, New York)
Red Hill (Ulster County, New York)
Red Kill Ridge
Red Mountain
Richmond Mountain
Rock Rift Mountain
Rose Mountain
Round Top
Roundtop (Franklin, Delaware County, New York)
Roundtop (Roxbury, Delaware County, New York)
Roundtop Mountain
Rum Hill
Sherman Hill
South Bearpen
South Mountain
South Plattekill Mountain
South Vly
Southwest Moresville Range
Sand Pond / Beaver Kill Ridge
South East Warren
Shultice Mountain
Silver Hollow / Edgewood
Sleeping Lion Mountain / Northeast Halcott
Speedwell Mountain
Spruce Mountain
St Anne's Peak / West Kill
Stadel Mountain
Stoppel Point
Sukkar Mountain
Taylor Hill
Tower Mountain
Tower Mountain
Twadell Mountain
Utsayantha Mountain
Van Loan Hill
Van Wyck Mountain
Vandervort Hill
Waiontha Mountain
Walnut Mountain
Walton Mountain
West Cave
West Stoppel Point
West Wildcat Mountain
Wheat Hill
White Hill
White Man Mountain
Willowemoc / Beaver Kill Ridge
Winnisook Lake
Woodhull Mountain
Woodpecker Ridge

Appalachian Mountains

The mountains of southern New York State are part of the Appalachian Mountains.  Ranges include:

Bellvale Mountain
Hudson Highlands
Anthony's Nose
Beacon Mountain
Bear Mountain
Black Ash Mountain
Blackcap Mountain
Black Mountain
Black Rock Mountain
Breakneck Ridge
Brooks Mountain
Brundige Mountain
Bull Hill (Mount Taurus)
Chipmunk Mountain
Car Pond Mountain
Cranberry Mountain
Crow's Nest
Diamond Mountain
Dunderberg Mountain
Echo Mountain
Fingerboard Mountain
Grape Swamp Mountain
Green Pond Mountain
Halfway Mountain
Hasenclever Mountain
Hogencamp Mountain
Horse Chock Mountain
Horse Stable Mountain
Irish Mountain
Island Pond Mountain
Jackie Jones Mountain
Knapp Mountain
Ladentown Mountain
Letterrock Mountain
Limekiln Mountain
Long Mountain
Nordkop Mountain
Panther Mountain
Parker Cabin Mountain
Pine Swamp Mountain
Popolopen Torne
Pound Swamp Mountain
Rockhouse Mountain
Squirrel Swamp Mountain
Stevens Mountain
Stockbridge Mountain
Storm King Mountain
Sugarloaf Mountain (Dutchess County, New York)
Sugarloaf Hill (Putnam County, New York)
Tom Jones Mountain
West Mountain
Joppenbergh Mountain
Marlboro Mountains
Ramapo Mountains
Shawangunk Ridge
Millbrook Mountain
Taconic Mountains
Alander Mountain
Berlin Mountain
Brace Mountain
Mount Raimer
White Rock

See also

 List of mountains of the United States

Sources
Myles, William J., Harriman Trails, A Guide and History, The New York-New Jersey Trail Conference, New York, N.Y., 1999.

External links
 Catskill High Peaks List Catskill 3500 Club

New York
 List
Mountains